The 2019–20 Basketbol Süper Ligi was the 54th season of the Basketbol Süper Ligi, the top-tier level professional club basketball league in Turkey. On 19 March 2020, the league was suspended due to the coronavirus pandemic in Turkey. On 11 May 2020, it was declared that the season was cancelled by the Turkish Basketball Federation.

Teams
On 5 May 2019, Bursaspor Durmazlar promoted to the BSL as the champions of the Turkish First League. It will be their first season in the Süper Ligi. OGM Ormanspor promoted to the BSL for the first time in club history as winners of the TBL play-offs.

Sakarya BB was relegated after finishing last in the 2018–19 BSL.

On 1 July 2019, Banvit B.K. changed its name as Bandırma B.İ.K.

On 16 September 2019 Istanbul BB announced that they withdrew from league due to financial issues. Instead of them, Sigortam.net İTÜ will play in the league.

Venues

Personnel and sponsorship

Head coaching changes

Rules
Each team is allowed to sign with ten foreign players, only five of them are allowed to be on the match day squad. In every round, teams can include different players from their foreign player pool.

Regular season

League table

Results

Awards
All official awards of the 2019–20 Basketbol Süper Ligi .

MVP of the Round

Notes:
 There was no awarding for the remaining of the weeks in the 2019–20, because the season was cancelled due to the coronavirus pandemic in Europe.

Turkish clubs in European competitions

 Cancelled due to the COVID-19 pandemic in Europe.

References

External links
Official Site
TBLStat.net History Page

Turkish Basketball Super League seasons
Turkish
1
Basketbol Süper Ligi